Emma Mackie (born 9 September 1984) is a road cyclist from Australia. She represented her nation at the 2009 UCI Road World Championships.

Australian football
Mackie successfully changed sports, winning Box Hill's best and fairest for the 2017 VFL Women's season. In April 2019, she was traded to expansion club St Kilda. In March 2020, Mackie retired from football.

See also
 2007 Vrienden van het Platteland season
 2009 Lotto–Belisol Ladiesteam season

References

External links

 profile at Procyclingstats.com

1984 births
Australian female cyclists
Living people
Place of birth missing (living people)
Western Bulldogs (AFLW) players
Australian rules footballers from Victoria (Australia)
St Kilda Football Club (AFLW) players